"The Sun Rising" is a song by English electronic music group the Beloved. It was released in October 1989 as the second single from their second album, Happiness (1990), and became a club favourite. The song also was the group's first top 40 hit in the UK, peaking at number 26 on the UK Singles Chart in November 1989. In 1997, the song was re-released, reaching number 31 in the UK.

Sample
The female vocal sample in "The Sun Rising" is from a song titled "O Euchari", sung by Emily Van Evera on the album A Feather on the Breath of God by Gothic Voices. The sample was not credited on the release of "The Sun Rising" single. An out of court settlement was reached between WEA and Gothic Voices' record label Hyperion Records for this omission.

Critical reception
Retrospectively, Jon O'Brien from AllMusic complimented the song as "gorgeous", remarking that it first introduced us to "the seductive whispering tones of frontman Jon Marsh and their unique fusion of Balearic beats and ethereal acid-house synths." Upon the release, Larry Flick from Billboard wrote, "Former U.K. club smash is given a deep, ambient house redressing that swirls, surrounds, and ultimately envelops the listener. Singer Jon Marsh's low-whisper vocals are a perfect complement." Pan-European magazine Music & Media commented, "House meets early 70s Temptations. A haunting melody and an insistent rhythm." They also declared the song as "excellent new age/house". Selina Webb from Music Week said, "The refrain comes courtesy of an ethereal chorister, adding to the dewy, other-world mood of this superb subterranean house track. Post-rave drive home music which marks the nearest Beloved have got to recapturing the style of their brilliant indie hit "Forever Dancing"." Another editor gave the 1997 re-release four out of five, adding, "A reissue that makes sense. This classic 1989 ambient house hit is reworked by Global Communications into a dreamy drum & bass track, which is already getting Kiss airplay."

Usage in media
In 1990, the song was used in a commercial for the breakfast cereal Alpen.

The song makes multiple appearances in the 2005 Channel 4 queer comedy-drama series Sugar Rush. 

In 2020, the song was used in an advert for online clothing store Kaleidoscope.

Track listings
 7" single
 "The Sun Rising" — 4:59
 "The Sun Rising" (Eurovisionary) — 3:37

 12" single
 "The Sun Rising" — 4:59
 "The Sun Rising" (Gentle Night) — 2:47
 "The Sun Rising" (Eurovisionary) — 5:09
 "The Sun Rising" (Deeply Satisfying) — 5:31

 12" remix single
 "The Sun Rising" (Il Sole Sorge) — 4:51
 "The Sun Rising" (Intensità) — 4:49
 "The Sun Rising" (Danny's "Love Is..." Remix) — 4:29
 "The Sun Rising" (Son Of The Rising House) — 5:20

 CD mini
 "The Sun Rising" — 4:59
 "The Sun Rising" (Eurovisionary) — 3:37
 "The Sun Rising" (Adam & Eve's House Of The Rising Sun) — 5:16
 "The Sun Rising" (Gentle Night) — 2:47

Charts

References

1989 singles
1997 singles
The Beloved (band) songs
Songs written by Jon Marsh
1989 songs
Warner Music Group singles
Acid house songs
Ambient songs